René Crabos (7 February 1899 – 17 June 1964) was a French rugby union player and administrator who represented the  national team 17 times between 1920 and 1924, and went on to be president of the Fédération Française de Rugby between 1952 and 1962, as well as president of the Fédération Internationale de Rugby Amateur (FIRA) (Now known as Rugby Europe) from 1954 to 1962. Cabos represented France at rugby in the 1920 Summer Olympics, the team won the silver medal.

The Under 18s French rugby union championship is named in his honour.

He was born in Saint-Sever and died in Saint-Sever.

References

External links
 
 
 
 

1899 births
1964 deaths
Sportspeople from Landes (department)
French rugby union players
Olympic rugby union players of France
Rugby union players at the 1920 Summer Olympics
Olympic silver medalists for France
France international rugby union players
French military personnel of World War I
Medalists at the 1920 Summer Olympics
Presidents of the French Rugby Federation